Straight from the Heart is a compilation album by David Houston and Tammy Wynette. It was released in December 1971, by Columbia Records on their Columbia Musical Treasuries imprint.

Background 
The album is a two LP set, made up of previously released and unreleased recordings. The first is an album of previously released songs by Houston, mostly from his 1971 album, A Woman Always Knows. The second is an album of songs by Wynette, featuring seven previously unreleased songs, as well as two songs from her 1970 album, The Ways to Love a Man, and two from her 1971 album, We Sure Can Love Each Other.

Track listing

David Houston

Tammy Wynette

References 

1971 compilation albums
Tammy Wynette compilation albums
David Houston (singer) albums